Hainesville may refer to:

 Hainesville, New Brunswick, Canada
 Hainesville, Illinois, United States
 Hainesville, New Jersey, United States
 Hainesville, Texas, United States
 Hainesville, Berkeley County, West Virginia, United States
 Hainesville, Hampshire County, West Virginia, United States

See also

 Haynesville